Korenica is a village in Municipality of Krivogaštani.

Demographics
According to the 2002 census, the village had a total of 62 inhabitants. Ethnic groups in the village include:

Macedonians 62

References

Villages in Krivogaštani Municipality